Kharar Assembly constituency (Sl. No.: 52) is a Punjab Legislative Assembly constituency in Kharar Sahibzada Ajit Singh Nagar district, Punjab state, India.
Anmol Gagan Maan of the Aam Aadmi Party is the incumbent MLA.

Members of the Legislative Assembly

Election results

2022

2017

See also
 List of constituencies of the Punjab Legislative Assembly
 Mohali district

References

External links
  

Assembly constituencies of Punjab, India
Sahibzada Ajit Singh Nagar district